These are the results of the men's singles competition in badminton at the 2013 Southeast Asian Games in Myanmar.

Medal winners

Draw

References 

Badminton at the 2013 Southeast Asian Games